Hamilton Island Golf Club is a golf course located in near the Island Resort Town of Hamilton Island in Queensland's Whitsunday Islands. Despite its name, the Hamilton Island Golf Club is actually located on neighbouring Dent Island - but is named as such because the course is owned and operated by Hamilton Island Enterprises (who own the leases on both Hamilton & Dent Islands) and the course can only be accessed via the official boat from Hamilton Island Marina. The 18-hole championship layout was designed by 5 times British Open Champion Peter Thomson and Ross Perret. Set amongst spectacular hills and escarpments overlooking the waterways of the Whitsunday Islands, the course was opened at Hamilton Island Race Week by Queensland Premier Anna Bligh in August 2009.

Course scorecard

Source

References

2009 establishments in Australia
Sports clubs established in 2009
Sports venues completed in 2009
Golf clubs and courses in Queensland
Whitsunday Islands